Irina Vladimirovna Kalinina (Ирина Владимировна Калинина; born February 8, 1959, in Penza) is a former Soviet diver and olympic champion. She competed at the 1980 Olympic Games in Moscow, where she won the gold medal in Women's 3 metre springboard.

Sports career 
At 1976 Montreal Olympics, she was fourth on the platform and seventh on the 3m springboard. At 1980 Olympics in Moscow she became the champion on the springboard.

She was a three-time world champion, won 5 medals at the European Championships. She was a 20-time prize-winner of the USSR championships.

In 1980 she graduated from the Faculty of Physical Education Penza State University. She worked as an athlete-coach of the USSR national team in diving in 1972-84. From 1984 she worked as a teaching coach at Specialized Children and Youth Sports School of the Olympic Reserve.

In 1984 she left the big sport. In 1984, the documentary “And all over again, every time” (directed by T. Chubakova) about the end of her career and the beginning of coaching was shot at CSDF.

Coaching career 
On completing her career, she works as a coach in Penza. She is an Honoured Coach of Russia.

Her husband Valery Bazhin is a former diver, World-Class Master of Sports of the USSR, Honoured Coach of Russia.

Her daughter Nadezhda Bazhina is a diver, World-Class Master of Sports of Russia, European champion, participant of the 2012 Summer Olympics in London.

In honour of Irina Kalinina, since 1988 an annual diving competition has been held in Penza.

See also
 List of members of the International Swimming Hall of Fame

References

1959 births
Living people
Russian female divers
Soviet female divers
Olympic divers of the Soviet Union
Divers at the 1976 Summer Olympics
Divers at the 1980 Summer Olympics
Olympic gold medalists for the Soviet Union
Olympic medalists in diving
Medalists at the 1980 Summer Olympics
World Aquatics Championships medalists in diving
Universiade medalists in diving
Universiade gold medalists for the Soviet Union
Medalists at the 1977 Summer Universiade
Medalists at the 1979 Summer Universiade
Honoured Coaches of Russia
Penza State University alumni